The Motorist Bride is a 1925 German silent romance film directed by Richard Eichberg and starring Hans Mierendorff, Lee Parry and Ernst Hofmann. The film is notable for the use of Lilian Harvey as a stunt double for Parry during the mountaineering scenes shot in Switzerland. Harvey quickly graduated to become the top star of Richard Eichberg's production company.

It premiered at the Marmorhaus in Berlin on 22 January 1925. The film's art direction is by Jacek Rotmil.

Cast
 Hans Mierendorff as Johann Amberg
 Lee Parry as Eva, seine Tochter
 Ernst Hofmann as Hans von Corell
 Angelo Ferrari as Frank Bruhn
 Sinaida Korolenko as Lili
 Max Grünberg as Heinz Ellhof
 Erwin van Roy as Gottlieb Daffke
 Hans Stürm as Gustav Briese
 Margarete Kupfer as Marta
 Gerhard Ritterband as Max
 Lilian Harvey as Eva (Stunt Double)

References

Bibliography

External links

1925 films
1920s romance films
Films of the Weimar Republic
German silent feature films
German romance films
Films directed by Richard Eichberg
German black-and-white films
1920s German films